CRISIL (formerly Credit Rating Information Services of India Limited) is an Indian analytical company providing ratings, research, and risk and policy advisory services and is a subsidiary of American company S&P Global.

CRISIL, was the first credit rating agency in India, introduced in 1988 by the ICICI and UTI jointly with share capital coming from SBI, LIC and United India Insurance Company.
In April 2005, US based credit rating agency S&P acquired the majority shares of company.

News 
The Late Ex-Union Minister for Finance and Corporate Affairs Shri Arun Jaitley launched CriSidEx, India’s first sentiment index for micro and small enterprises (MSEs) developed jointly by CRISIL and SIDBI.

CriSidEx is a composite index based on a diffusion index of 8 parameters and measures MSE business sentiment on a scale of 0 (extremely negative) to 200 (extremely positive). CriSidEx will have two indices, one for the 'survey quarter' and another for 'next quarter' once a trend emerges after few rounds of the survey, providing independent time series data. The parametric feedback was captured through a survey of 1100 MSEs in November –December.

In February 2020, Crisil completed the acquisition of Greenwich Associates LLC, a provider of proprietary benchmarking data, analytics, and qualitative insights to financial services firms.

References 

S&P Global
Financial services companies based in Mumbai
Indian subsidiaries of foreign companies
Credit rating agencies in India
2005 mergers and acquisitions
1987 establishments in Maharashtra
Indian companies established in 1987
Financial services companies established in 1987
Companies listed on the National Stock Exchange of India
Companies listed on the Bombay Stock Exchange